Laurent Seksik (born Nice, 1962) is a French writer. A practising doctor, he published his first novel in 1999. He is best known for his trilogy of historical novels: Les derniers jours de Stefan Zweig, Le cas Eduard Einstein and Romain Gary s'en va-t-en guerre. He has also published a biography of Albert Einstein. The Last Days of Stefan Zweig has been adapted for stage and screen, and has been translated into English by Andre Naffis Sahely.

References

French novelists
French biographers
French male non-fiction writers
20th-century French male writers
People from Nice
1962 births
20th-century French physicians
Living people